Aegle ( "brightness" or "dazzling light") is the name of several different figures in Greek mythology:
Aegle, one of the daughters of Asclepius by Lampetia, the daughter of the Sun, according to Hermippus. Her name is said to have derived from "Αἴγλη" ("Aegle"), meaning "Brightness," or "Splendor," either from the beauty of the human body when in good health, or from the honor paid to the medical profession.
Aegle, the most beautiful of the Naiads, daughter of Zeus and Neaera, by whom Helios begot the Charites.
Aegle, one of the Heliades, a sister of Phaeton, and daughter of Helios and Clymene. In her grief at the death of her brother she and her sisters were changed into poplars.
Aegle, one of the Hesperides.
Aegle, another name of Coronis, daughter of Phlegyas and lover of Apollo.
Aegle, was a daughter of Panopeus, the Phocian hero. She was said to be one who was beloved by Theseus, and for whom he forsook Ariadne.

Classical Literature Sources 
Aegle

Chronological listing of classical literature sources for  Aigle or Aegle:

 Hesiod, Catalogues of Women and Eoiae 76 (trans. Evelyn-White) (Greek epic poetry C8th to C7th BC)
 Hesiod, Doubtful Fragment 5 (trans. Evelyn-White) (Greek epic poetry C8th to C7th BC)
 Anonymous, Paean of Dium (or Erythrae) 130 (Lyra Graeca trans. Edmonds 1927 Vol. 3 p. 483-485) (C6th BC to C5th BC)
 Scholiast on Aeschylus, Fragments Eliades (Aeschylus trans. Weir Smtyh 1926 Vol 2 p. 402)
 Apollonius Rhodius, Argonautica 4. 1390 - 1451 (trans. Coleridge) (Greek epic poetry C3rd BC)
 Scholiast on Apollonius Rhodius, Argonautica 4. 1396 (The Argonautica of Apollonius Rhodius trans. Coleridge 1889 p. 195)
 Virgil, Eclogue 6. 20 ff (trans. Fairclough) (Roman poetry C1st BC)
 Scholiast on  P. Oxy. 4099, Mythological Compendium lns 6,13 (The Oxyrhynchus Papyri trans. Fowler 1995 Vol 61 p. 56) (Greek mythography C1st BC to 1stAD)
 Pliny the Elder, Natural History 35. 40. 137 (trans. Rackham) (Roman encyclopedia C1st AD)
 Lucan, Pharsalia 9. 358 ff (trans. Riley) (Roman poetry C1st AD)
 Scholiast on Lucan, Pharsalia 9. 362 (The Pharsalia of Lucan trans. Riley 1853 p. 358)
 Plutarch, Theseus 20. 1 ff (trans. Perrin) (Greek history C1st to C2nd AD)
 Plutarch, Theseus 28. 2 ff
 Pseudo-Apollodorus, The Library 2. 5. 11 ff (trans. Frazer) (Greek mythography C2nd AD)
 Pausanias, Description of Greece 9. 35. 5 ff (trans. Frazer) (Greek mythography C2nd AD)
 Pseudo-Hyginus, Fabulae Preface (trans. Grant) (Roman mythography C2nd AD)
 Pseudo-Hyginus, Fabulae 154
 Pseudo-Hyginus, Fabulae 156
 Diogenes Laertius, Fragment 317 (Stoicorum Veterum Fragmenta Arnim 1964 Vols 1 p.69) (Greek biography C3 AD)
 Proclus, Proclus on the Timeus of Plato 4 (trans. T. Taylor) (Greek Philosophy C5 AD)
 Scholiast on Proclus, Proclus on the Timeus of Plato 4 (Commentaries of Proclus on the Timaeus of Plato trans. T. Taylor 1820 Vol 2 p. 292)
 Nonnos, Dionysiaca 14. 221 (trans. Rouse) (Greek epic poetry C5th AD)
 Suidas s.v. Ἠπιόνη (trans. Hedlam in Herodas 1922 p. 176 ) (Greco-Byzantine Lexicon C10th AD)
 Second Vatican Mythographer, Scriptores rerum mythicarum, 161 Aurea poma (ed. Bode) (Greek and Roman mythography C11th AD)
 Third Vatican Mythographer, Scriptores rerum mythicarum 13 Hurcules 5. 42 ff (ed. Bode) (Greek and Roman mythography C11th AD to C13th AD)

Notes

References 

 Apollodorus, The Library with an English Translation by Sir James George Frazer, F.B.A., F.R.S. in 2 Volumes, Cambridge, MA, Harvard University Press; London, William Heinemann Ltd. 1921. ISBN 0-674-99135-4. Online version at the Perseus Digital Library. Greek text available from the same website.
Athenaeus of Naucratis. The Deipnosophists or Banquet of the Learned. London. Henry G. Bohn, York Street, Covent Garden. 1854.  Online version at the Perseus Digital Library.
 Athenaeus of Naucratis. Deipnosophistae. Kaibel. In Aedibus B.G. Teubneri. Lipsiae. 1887. Greek text available at the Perseus Digital Library.
Bell, Robert E., Women of Classical Mythology: A Biographical Dictionary. ABC-Clio. 1991. .
Gaius Julius Hyginus, Fabulae from The Myths of Hyginus translated and edited by Mary Grant. University of Kansas Publications in Humanistic Studies. Online version at the Topos Text Project.
 Maurus Servius Honoratus, In Vergilii carmina comentarii. Servii Grammatici qui feruntur in Vergilii carmina commentarii; recensuerunt Georgius Thilo et Hermannus Hagen. Georgius Thilo. Leipzig. B. G. Teubner. 1881. Online version at the Perseus Digital Library.
 Pausanias, Description of Greece with an English Translation by W.H.S. Jones, Litt.D., and H.A. Ormerod, M.A., in 4 Volumes. Cambridge, MA, Harvard University Press; London, William Heinemann Ltd. 1918. . Online version at the Perseus Digital Library
Pausanias, Graeciae Descriptio. 3 vols. Leipzig, Teubner. 1903.  Greek text available at the Perseus Digital Library.
Pliny the Elder, The Natural History. John Bostock, M.D., F.R.S. H.T. Riley, Esq., B.A. London. Taylor and Francis, Red Lion Court, Fleet Street. 1855. Online version at the Perseus Digital Library.
Pliny the Elder, Naturalis Historia. Karl Friedrich Theodor Mayhoff. Lipsiae. Teubner. 1906. Latin text available at the Perseus Digital Library.
 Plutarch, Lives with an English Translation by Bernadotte Perrin. Cambridge, MA. Harvard University Press. London. William Heinemann Ltd. 1914. 1. Online version at the Perseus Digital Library. Greek text available from the same website.
 Publius Vergilius Maro, Eclogues. J. B. Greenough. Boston. Ginn & Co. 1895. Online version at the Perseus Digital Library.
 Publius Vergilius Maro, Bucolics, Aeneid, and Georgics of Vergil. J. B. Greenough. Boston. Ginn & Co. 1900. Latin text available at the Perseus Digital Library.

Naiads
Children of Zeus
Hesperides
Women of Helios
Women of Apollo
Metamorphoses into trees in Greek mythology